Theropogon is a genus of plants in the Nolinoideae. It contains only one known species, Theropogon pallidus, native to Tibet, Yunnan, and the Himalayas (northern and eastern India, Nepal, Bhutan, Sikkim, Assam, Myanmar).

References

External links
Flowers of India, Himalayan Theropogon   

Nolinoideae
Monotypic Asparagaceae genera
Flora of Tibet
Flora of Yunnan
Flora of Assam (region)
Flora of East Himalaya
Flora of Nepal
Flora of West Himalaya
Flora of Myanmar